These are lists of places in the U.S. state of Kansas.

Lists
Communities
 List of counties in Kansas
 List of townships in Kansas
 List of cities in Kansas
 List of unincorporated communities in Kansas
 List of ghost towns in Kansas

Places
 List of Kansas landmarks
 List of Kansas rivers
 List of Kansas state parks
 List of lakes, reservoirs, and dams in Kansas
 List of museums in Kansas
 List of Registered Historic Places in Kansas

Schools
 List of high schools in Kansas
 List of unified school districts in Kansas
 List of colleges and universities in Kansas
 List of defunct colleges and universities in Kansas
 List of oldest buildings on Kansas colleges and universities

Other
 List of hospitals in Kansas
 List of Kansas state prisons

People
 List of people from Kansas

Topical lists
 List of Kansas county name etymologies
 Kansas locations by per capita income

Lists of places in the United States by state
Places